This article contains a list of nuclear weapon explosion sites used across the world.  It includes nuclear test sites, nuclear combat sites, launch sites for rockets forming part of a nuclear test, and peaceful nuclear test (PNE) sites.  There are a few non-nuclear sites included, such as the Degelen Omega chemical blast sites, which are intimately involved with nuclear testing.  Listed with each is an approximate location and coordinate link for viewing through GeoHack, and each site is linked to a Wikipedia page on the locality or the nuclear event(s) that occurred there.

References

See also
 List of Milestone nuclear explosions
 List of nuclear and radiation accidents and incidents
 List of nuclear weapons tests
 Worldwide nuclear testing counts and summary

Test sites
 
Test sites